Mor Yulios Elias Qoro (Elias Mar Julius) (1881–1962) was a Syriac Orthodox Church Bishop and the Patriarchal Delegate of India, Born as Elias Malke Qoro at Mardin on August 1, 1881,educated at school of the Church of the Forty Martyrs of Sebaste. He joined Dairo d-Kurkmo (Mor Hananyo Monastery) in 1902, and became a monk on 16 June 1905. He was appointed secretary to Ignatius Abded Aloho II Patriarch of Antioch in 1906, and was ordained kashisho in 1908. He became abbot of Mor Hananyo Monastery in 1911, and was appointed director of its printing press. He was consecrated bishop on 23 September 1923 in the Church of the Forty Martyrs by Ignatius Elias III Patriarch of Antioch, appointed to serve in Malankara. He served as Patriarchal Delegate to Malankara in 1927. In 1932, he established Mor Ignatius Dayro Manjinikkara on the tomb of Elias III Patriarch of Antioch at Omallur, Kerala. He established and approved order for various monasteries and churches in Kerala. He died in 1962 at Omallur, Kerala, India and was buried at Mor Ignatius Dayro Manjinikkara.

Succession

References

Syriac Orthodox Church bishops
Oriental Orthodoxy in India
1881 births
1962 deaths
Turkish religious leaders
Turkish Oriental Orthodox Christians
People from Mardin